Rhachistia rhodotaenia is a species of air-breathing land snail, a pulmonate gastropod mollusk in the family Cerastidae.

Rhachistia rhodotaenia is the type species of the genus Rhachistia.

Description

Distribution 
This species occurs in Africa.

References

Further reading 
  Kobelt W. (1909) Die Molluskenausbeute der Erlangerschen Reise in Nordost-Afrika. Ein Beitrag zur Molluskengeographie von Afrika. Frankfurt am Main. page 16, Table 2 figure 7-17.

Cerastidae